Jesse Thielke (born June 9, 1992) is an American Greco-Roman wrestler who competed at the 2016 Olympics.

High school career 
In high school Thielke was a four-time state champion for Germantown High School in Germantown, Wisconsin.  He finished with a record of 185-1, including a victory over eventual Dan Hodge Trophy winner Alex Dieringer.

College career 
He wrestled two seasons for the Wisconsin Badgers before taking an Olympic redshirt in the 2015–16 season.

International career 
He won the 2016 U.S. Olympic Trials, defeating Spenser Mango in the semifinals and Ildar Hafizov in the finals.

Thielke qualified for the 2016 Olympics by finishing second and in the last qualifying spot at the 2016 World Wrestling Olympic Qualification Tournament 2.  To qualify he came from behind in the quarterfinals and semifinals.

At the 2016 Olympics, Theilke defeated Mehdi Messaoudi of Morocco in the Round of 16, defeating Messaoudi 8-0. Thielke would then face Rovshan Bayramov, losing 8-0 to the former world champion and two-time Olympic silver medalist.

References

External links 
 

American male sport wrestlers
Living people
1992 births
Wrestlers at the 2016 Summer Olympics
Olympic wrestlers of the United States
People from Germantown, Wisconsin